Triacetylmethane is the organic compound with the formula .  It is a colorless liquid that is soluble in organic solvents and in alkaline water.  It readily forms an enolate.  The enolate forms a variety of metal complexes related to the metal acetylacetonates.

References

Triketones
Chelating agents
Tridentate ligands
3-Hydroxypropenals
Enols